The 2021–22 Úrvalsdeild karla was the 71st season of the Úrvalsdeild karla, the top tier men's basketball league in Iceland. The season started on 7 October 2021 and ended on 18 May 2022. Valur won its third title, and its first in 39 years, by defeating Tindastóll 3–2 in the Finals.

Competition format
The participating teams first played a conventional round-robin schedule with every team playing each opponent once home and once away for a total of 22 games. The top eight teams qualified for the championship playoffs whilst the two last qualified were relegated to Division 1.

Teams

Managerial changes

Regular season

Standings

Playoffs

Bracket

Notable occurrences
On 8 June, Keflavík signed Jaka Brodnik who previously played for Tindastóll.
On 13 June, it was reported that Þór Akureyri's guard Júlíus Orri Ágústsson would leave the team and play for Caldwell University.
On 24 June, it was reported that Danero Thomas signed with newly promoted Breiðablik after playing with ÍR the previous two seasons.
On 25 June, it was reported that Everage Richardson had signed with Breiðablik after one season with ÍR.
On 25 June, it was reported that Icelandic national team member Breki Gylfason had signed with ÍR after having played previously for Haukar.
On 28 June, Icelandic national team member Sigtryggur Arnar Björnsson signed with Tindastóll after playing in the LEB Oro the previous season.
On 29 June, Tindastóll signed Irish national team member Taiwo Badmus.
On 30 June, Tindastóll signed former NBA G League player Javon Bess.
On 12 July, Tindastóll signed Swedish national team member Thomas Massamba.
On 13 July, Keflavík signed Icelandic national team member Halldór Garðar Hermannsson from reigning national champions Þór Þorlákshöfn.
On 15 July, Þór Þorlákshöfn announced it had signed Danish national team member Daniel Mortensen and Lithuanian Ronaldas Rutkauskas.
On 20 July, reigning Úrvalsdeild Foreign Player of the Year, Deane Williams, signed with  LNB Pro B club Saint-Quentin after two seasons with Keflavík.
On 4 August, Grindavík signed Spanish center Ivan Aurrecoechea who played the previous season with Þór Akureyri.
On 8 August, Keflavík signed David Okeke who won the Georgian Superliga championship with BC Rustavi the previous season.
On 9 August, Icelandic national team member Ragnar Nathanaelsson signed with Stjarnan after spending the previous season with Haukar.
On 14 August, former Argentina national team member Nicolás Richotti signed with Njarðvík.
On 17 August, ÍR signed Shakir Smith.
On 21 August, Njarðvík signed Former Liga ACB player Fotios Lampropoulos.
On 24 August, Þór Akureyri signed Irish national team member Jordan Blount.
On 28 August, Valur signed Icelandic national team member Kári Jónsson.
On 3 September, Finnur Atli Magnússon signed with Haukar.
On 11 September, Valur signed Callum Lawson who won the national championship with Þór Þorlákshöfn the previous season.
On 2 October, Dagur Kár Jónsson left Grindavík and signed with Club Ourense Baloncesto of the LEB Plata.
On 29 October, Grindavík signed E. C. Matthews.
On 8 November, Þór Akureyri signed former Switzerland national team member Jeremy Landenbergue to replace injured Jordan Blount.
On 9 November, Þór Akureyri signed Reggie Keely to replace injured Jonathan Lawton.
On 11 November, Sigurður Þorsteinsson became the 11th player to grab 2,000 career rebounds in the Úrvalsdeild.
On 17 November, ÍR signed Igor Marić.
On 10 December, Keflavík star forward David Okeke suffered an achilles injury in a game against Tindastóll. Prior to the injury he had grabbed a season high 17 rebounds in the game.
On 30 December, Tindastóll signed Zoran Vrkić to replace Thomas Massamba.
On 2 January, it was reported that Breiðablik had signed Frank Aron Booker.
On 14 January, it was reported that KR had signed Finnish national team member Carl Lindbom.
On 4 April, KR announced it had reached an agreement with Isaiah Manderson to release him from his contract just before the start of the playoffs.

References

External links
Official Icelandic Basketball Association website
Season info on Icelandic Basketball Association

Icelandic
Lea
Úrvalsdeild karla (basketball)